Zetland Hall is the name given to two buildings in Hong Kong, one historic, the other modern. Both have housed Masonic Lodges.

The original Zetland Hall
The original Zetland Hall, fondly referred to as The Bungalow, was the second meeting hall of the Freemasons in Hong Kong. It was built in 1865 and destroyed by an American air raid in 1944, during the Japanese occupation of Hong Kong. 

The building was located at the upper junction of Zetland Street and Ice House Street, where a Hong Kong Electric sub-station stands today. The building was designed by the Surveyor-General, Charles St George Cleverly, who also designed Government House. The building took its name from Zetland Lodge No. 525, the Masonic lodge that built it, and that was itself named for Thomas Dundas, 2nd Earl of Zetland, Grand Master of the United Grand Lodge of England from 1844 to 1870.

Zetland Lodge remained in use until the Second World War when it was severely damaged during an air raid.

Second Zetland Hall
In 1949, the architectural firm of Leigh & Orange designed new premises for the Lodge at 1 Kennedy Road, Mid-Levels, which it still occupies. This building is also known as Zetland Hall, and has become the headquarters of the District Grand Lodge of Hong Kong and the Far East (which operates as part of the United Grand Lodge of England).

References

External links
 Zetland Hall website

Mid-Levels
Central, Hong Kong
Buildings and structures in Hong Kong
Masonic buildings